Waterson may refer to:

People
 Alan Waterson (1915–2003), Australian amateur golfer
 Alfred Waterson (1880–1964), Member of Parliament of the United Kingdom
 Chris Waterson (footballer, born 1969) (born 1969), Australian footballer for Fitzroy
 Chris Waterson (footballer, born 1961) (born 1961), Australian footballer for Essendon and Brisbane
 Colin Waterson (footballer) (born 1959), Australian footballer for Richmond and East Fremantle
 Colin Waterson (born 1980), Scottish musician.
 Edward Waterson (died 1594), English Catholic priest and martyr
 Fred Waterson (1877–1918), English footballer
 Lal Waterson (1943–1998), English folksinger and songwriter
 Michelle Waterson (born 1986), American fighter
 Mike Waterson (1941–2011), singer and songwriter
 Nigel Waterson (born 1950), Member of Parliament for Eastbourne
 James Waterson (fl. 1993–1996), Scottish footballer
 John Waterson (died 1656), London publisher
 John James Waterston (1811–1883?), Scottish physicist
 Norma Waterson (1939-2022), English musician
 Tim Waterson, Canadian drummer

Music groups
 The Watersons, an English folk group
 Waterson–Carthy, an English folk group

Other uses
 Waterson Point State Park, New York, U.S.
 Waterson, Berlin & Snyder, Inc., a music publishing firm from the early 20th century

See also
 Watterson (disambiguation)